1703 Naval Air Squadron of the Fleet Air Arm of the Royal Navy was formed in August 1945 at RNAS Lee-on-Solent for duties in the Pacific. It was equipped with the Supermarine Sea Otter.

World War II ended in the same month that the squadron was formed, and it never deployed or saw action.

Aircraft flown
1703 Naval Air Squadron flew only one aircraft type:

Supermarine Sea Otter

References

External links
 

1700 series Fleet Air Arm squadrons
Military units and formations established in 1945